Trevor Roberts is the name of:

Trevor Roberts (footballer), Welsh footballer
Trevor Roberts, 2nd Baron Clwyd, Welsh peer